Abraham Shneior (also "Avraham" and "Shneur", "Schneor," or "Shaneir"; אברהם שניאור; December 9, 1928 – February 24, 1998) was an Israeli Olympic basketball player. He was born in Mandatory Palestine.

Basketball career
His club was Maccabi Tel Aviv, in Tel Aviv, Israel.

He competed for Israel at the 1952 Summer Olympics in Helsinki at the age of 23. He was the flag bearer for Team Israel at the Olympics. In Men's Basketball the Israeli team came in tied for 20th, after losing to the Philippines 57–47 in a game in which he scored 8 points, and losing to Greece 54–52 in a game in which he scored 12 points.

He won a silver medal with Team Israel in the 1953 Maccabiah Games.

He was also on the Israel national basketball team in the 1954 FIBA World Basketball Championship for Men, in which he led the team with an average of 10.8 points per game and Israel came in 8th out of 12 teams.

Playing for Israel at the EuroBasket 1953 - Final Round, he averaged 9.7 points per game, and playing for Israel at the EuroBasket 1959 - Final Round, he averaged 4.3 points per game.

References 

Olympic basketball players of Israel
Maccabi Tel Aviv B.C. players
Maccabiah Games silver medalists for Israel
Maccabiah Games medalists in basketball
Competitors at the 1953 Maccabiah Games
Israeli men's basketball players
1928 births
1998 deaths
Basketball players at the 1952 Summer Olympics
Burials at Yarkon Cemetery
1954 FIBA World Championship players